Daniel O'Brien, 3rd Viscount Clare (died 1691), was with King Charles II in exile during the interregnum. At the Restoration, he obtained the title of Viscount Clare for his grandfather and full restoration of the family's lands. At the Glorious Revolution he supported James II, sitting in the Patriot Parliament and fighting for him at the Battle of the Boyne. He was in consequence attainted as a Jacobite.

Birth and origins 

Daniel was born roughly about 1620, probably at Carrigaholt Castle, County Clare, his parents' habitual residence. He was the only son of Connor O'Brien ( – 1670) and his wife Honora O'Brien. At the time of his birth, his father was the heir apparent of his grandfather, O'Brien of Carrigaholt, who was a younger brother of Donogh O'Brien, 4th Earl of Thomond. His father's family was the senior branch of the O'Briens, a Gaelic Irish dynasty that descended from Brian Boru, medieval high king of Ireland.

His mother's family were the O'Briens of Duagh, County Kerry, a cadet branch of the O'Briens that descended from Donal, younger brother of Donough O'Brien, 2nd Earl of Thomond. Daniel was one of six siblings, who are listed in his father's article.

Early life 
O'Brien lived as a young man through the Irish Rebellion of 1641, the Irish Confederate Wars, and the Cromwellian conquest of Ireland, probably fighting under the command of his father and grandfather. He probably was the "Daniel O'Bryan" who was given as hostage to General Edmund Ludlow at the surrender of Ross Castle on 27 June 1652.

He went with his father and grandfather into French exile and seems to have ben a courtier at Charles II's court in exile. At the Restoration in 1660 he returned to England or Ireland with his father and grandfather. On 11 July 1662 Charles II created his grandfather Baron Moyarta and Viscount Clare. The honour was intended for him, Daniel, into whose hands the estate was directly conveyed. His grandfather died in 1663 or in 1666, and his father succeed as 2nd Viscount and he gained the courtesy title of Baron Moyarta.

Marriage and children 
He married Philadelphia Lennard, sister of the Thomas, Earl of Sussex.

Daniel and Philadelphia had three children:
 Honora O'Brien
 Daniel (died 1693), 4th viscount died unmarried in French exile
 Charles (1673–1706), 5th viscount, who died of wounds received at the Battle of Ramillies fighting for the French

Later life 
At his father's death in 1670 Moyarta succeeded as the 3rd Viscount Clare.

In August 1674 Clare, as he was now, was appointed commander of a newly raised regiment of foot, Clare's Regiment of Foot, an Irish regiment in the Dutch States Army. He was replaced within twelve months by Sir John Fenwick. From July 1751 on this regiment would be known as the 5th Regiment of Foot.

In 1689 he sat in the House of Lords of the Patriot Parliament.

During the War of the Two Kings, Clare served with the Jacobite Irish Army loyal to James II. He was the colonel of Clare's Dragoons, which he led against William of Orange at the Battle of the Boyne (1 July 1690) and was later exiled in France as part of the Flight of the Wild Geese.

In 1689 James II of England appointed Clare, as he was now, together with Boileau as joint governors of Cork. On 11 August Clare imprisoned the Protestants of the city in St Peter, Christchurch, and the courthouses. They were later detained in the castles of Blarney and Macroom. In 1690 Clare fought for James at the Battle of the Boyne.

Death and timeline 
Daniel died in 1691. He was outlawed on 11 May 1691.

Notes and references

Notes

Citations

Sources 
 
 
 
 
  – N to R
  – S to T (for Thomond)
  – Canonteign to Cutts (for Clare)
 
 
  – 1625 to 1655
  – (for timeline)
  – 1603 to 1860
  – 1634 to 1699
 
 
  – Irish stem
 
 
  – Topography
  – History
  – 1641 to 1643
 

1691 deaths
17th-century births
17th-century Irish people
Irish Jacobites
Irish soldiers in the army of James II of England
Irish soldiers in the French Army
Members of the Irish House of Lords
Daniel
People from County Clare
Viscounts in the Peerage of Ireland
Wild Geese (soldiers)